Columbia, Missouri, held an election for Mayor of Columbia, Missouri, on April 5, 2016.

Background 
On September 21, 2015, Incumbent mayor Bob McDavid announced he would not run for re-election to a third term. Citing personal reasons, McDavid stated to the press "There are a lot of personal issues that are involved with this decision. It had to do with my wife, myself and our plans."

Candidate petition filings for the municipal elections were open beginning October 27, 2015 at 8:00 am and closed on January 12, 2016. Candidates running for mayor required the valid signatures of at least 100 (but not exceeding 150) registered Columbia voters.

Campaign 
Local attorney Skip Walther was the first candidate to enter the race on September 22, 2015.

Walther ran unopposed in the campaign until Brian Treece, a political consultant and the chairman of the Downtown Columbia Leadership Council, formed a campaign committee on December 1. Treece officially announced his intentions to run for mayor the following day.

Endorsements

Brian Treece 
On December 10, 2015, the Columbia Police Officers Association endorsed Brian Treece in a news release, citing his support for expanding the ranks of the Columbia Police Department and his experience lobbying for the Missouri Fraternal Order of Police.

Brian Treece garnered the endorsement of Laborers' International Union of North America Local 773, the first public endorsement for a candidate in the union's history. In a press release, Local 773 field representative Regina Guevara attributed the endorsement to Treece's support for workers and organized labor, additionally stating he was "committed to addressing our long neglected infrastructure issues."

On February 18, 2016, Brian Treece additionally won the endorsement of Columbia Professional Fire Fighters Local 1055, which represented roughly 90% of firefighters in the Columbia Fire Department.

Skip Walthers 
Incumbent mayor Bob McDavid and previous mayor Darwin Hindman both announced their endorsement of Skip Walther on March 11, 2016.

Results 
Brian Treece defeated Skip Walther by a close margin.

Reactions and aftermath 
In his victory speech, Brian Treece thanked his supporters and characterized the election as a "referendum on whether Columbia is going to be a city that works for all of us."

Skip Walthers conceded the election to Brian Treece at his campaign watch party, telling supporters “Despite tonight’s result I am proud of the campaign we ran, for the message we tried to deliver and most of all, I am proud to call all of you my friends." Walthers walked to Brian Treece's watch party afterwards to congratulate Treece in person.

References 

Columbia
21st century in Columbia, Missouri
Columbia
Non-partisan elections
Mayoral elections in Columbia, Missouri